The Bangsamoro Government Center, also known as the Office of the Chief Minister (OCM), or simply the Bangsamoro Office, is a government building in Cotabato City, Philippines. It serves as the executive office of the Chief Minister of the Bangsamoro Autonomous Region in Muslim Mindanao and formerly served as the executive office of Regional Governor of the now defunct-Autonomous Region in Muslim Mindanao. Nicknamed as the "Little Malacañan of the South", it was built in 1976 by then-President Ferdinand Marcos. The building was formerly known as the Office of the Regional Governor (ORG). The building was renamed as the Office of the Bangsamoro People upon the completion of its seven-month renovation on July 30, 2014. The building also includes a  prayer room.

References

Buildings and structures in Cotabato City
Local government buildings in the Philippines
Landmarks in the Philippines